NGC 322 is a lenticular galaxy located approximately 318 million light-years from the Solar System in the constellation Phoenix. It was discovered on September 5, 1834 by John Herschel. It was described by Dreyer as "very faint, very small, round, a little brighter middle, 3 stars to west." It apparently seems to be interacting with PGC 95427, another galaxy.

See also 
 Lenticular galaxy 
 List of NGC objects (1–1000)
 Phoenix (constellation)

References

External links 
 
 SEDS

0322
3412
18340905
Phoenix (constellation)
Lenticular galaxies
Discoveries by John Herschel